Lano may refer to:

Lano, Haute-Corse, France
Lano, Colle di Val d'Elsa, village in Tuscany, Italy
Lano, Samoa, village on the island of Savai'i
Laño, a small populated place in Condado de Treviño, Treviño enclave, province of Burgos, Spain, known for palaeontological discoveries
Lano and Woodley, Australian comedy team
Angelo Lano, American FBI agent
Jenya Lano, Russian actress
Kevin Lano, computer programmer
Stefan Lano, American musician
Lano (soap), Norwegian soap brand

See also
 Llano (disambiguation)